Timoci Nagusa (born 14 July 1987 in Nadi, Fiji) is a Fijian rugby union footballer.  He plays as a wing. He played his rugby for French club, Montpelier for 10 years before leaving for ProD2 club Grenoble in 2020. He is 1.88m (6'2) and weighs 88 kg. He worked as a Police constable in Fiji before his rugby career took off.

Bio
Nagusa played for Tailevu in the Colonial Cup competition. He helped Tailevu win the Sullivan Farebrother Trophy in 2007 and because of his performance, he was included into the Tailevu Knights squad for the 2008 team. He was also named Man of Match in two of the Knights Colonial Cup matches after which he was chosen into the Fiji Warriors team for the Pacific Rugby Cup and his performance guaranteed him a spot in the Fiji team for the 2008 IRB Pacific Nations Cup where he made his debut against Samoa on the right wing working admirably well alongside the experienced centre, Sireli Naqelevuki and renowned winger, Vilimoni Delasau to score two tries. His performance caught the attention of Ulster Rugby Head Coach, Matt Williams, who formerly coached the NSW Waratahs, and Leinster were in search of a new wing.

In 2010, he left Ulster and joined French Top 14 side, Montpelier for their 2010–2011 season

Nagusa scored a brilliant individual try for Montpelier against Stade Toulousain in the French Top 14 final for the 2010–2011 season.
In February 2015, he signed a contract extension to the club till 2018.

He ended the 2015–2016 as the top try scorer with 15 tries. He took a longer break after the season and refused to return to the club.

Honours
 2015–16 European Rugby Challenge Cup : winner.

References

Fiji Rugby Union on Wikipedia

External links
 Fiji Rugby profile
 Ulster Rugby profile

1987 births
Living people
Rugby union wings
Rugby union fullbacks
Fijian rugby union players
Ulster Rugby players
Montpellier Hérault Rugby players
Sportspeople from Nadi
People from Tailevu Province
Fiji international rugby union players
Fijian expatriate rugby union players
Expatriate rugby union players in Northern Ireland
Expatriate rugby union players in France
Fijian expatriate sportspeople in France
Fijian expatriate sportspeople in Northern Ireland
I-Taukei Fijian people